Nicolas Santos (born January 5, 1988) is a tennis player from Brazil. He was the number 2 ranked junior player in the world in 2006.

Santos has a career high ATP singles ranking of World No. 457, achieved on 29 April 2013. He also has a career high ATP doubles ranking of World number 349, achieved on 31 January 2011.

Career
Santos won his first ITF Pro Circuit singles titles in Brasília in April 2011, beating Eládio Ribeiro Neto in the final in three sets. He earned his second career singles title in August 2012, beating Thiago Monteiro in the final, 6–2, 6–2, in São José do Rio Preto.

Santos has reached eight career singles finals, with a record of 3 wins and 5 losses all coming on the ITF Futures Circuit. Additionally, he has reached 34 doubles finals with a record of 12 wins and 22 losses, also all occurring at the ITF Futures level.

ATP Challenger and ITF Futures finals

Singles: 8 (3–5)

Doubles: 34 (12–22)

References

Sources

1988 births
Living people
Brazilian male tennis players
South American Games medalists in tennis
South American Games gold medalists for Brazil
Competitors at the 2006 South American Games
Sportspeople from São Paulo (state)
21st-century Brazilian people
20th-century Brazilian people